This list includes the historic houses, castles, abbeys, museums and other buildings and monuments in the care of Historic Environment Scotland (HES). HES is a non-departmental public body of the Scottish Government, responsible for investigating, caring for and promoting Scotland’s historic environment. It maintains over 300 properties, that together attract more than 3 million visitors annually.

Aberdeen

Aberdeenshire

Angus

Argyll and Bute

Ayrshire

East Ayrshire

North Ayrshire

South Ayrshire

Clackmannanshire

Dumfries and Galloway

Dunbartonshire

East Dunbartonshire

West Dunbartonshire

Dundee

Edinburgh

Falkirk (council area)

Fife

Glasgow

Highland (council area)

Inverclyde

Lanarkshire

North Lanarkshire

South Lanarkshire

Lothian

East Lothian

Midlothian

West Lothian

Moray

Orkney Islands

Outer Hebrides

Perth and Kinross

Renfrewshire

Scottish Borders

Shetland

Stirling (council area)

See also

List of Cadw properties (Wales)
List of English Heritage properties

References

External links
Historic Environment Scotland - Visit a Place

 
Historic Environment Scotland
Historic Environment Scotland